In the Dutch Mountains is an album by The Nits. It was released in October 1987 by Columbia Records.

About the album
After the release of their meticulously assembled and produced previous album, Henk (1986), which ended up sounding somewhat lifeless, the band decided to go back to basics and record this, their next album, live to two-track in their own rehearsal space to, in their own words, "reproduce the special atmosphere of a Nits concert". As a result, the songs sound far more sparkling without becoming rough or rushed.

Lyrically, singer Hofstede delves into his childhood memories, conjuring up a vision of childhood life in the Netherlands  in the 1950s and 1960s. The album cover reflects this, featuring actual historical Children's Benefit stamps. Even though they resemble young versions of all four band members, they are in fact real Dutch stamps from 1951.

In the Dutch Mountains was the Nits' most successful album to date and the first to gain a UK release. Its lead single and title track was a reasonable hit across the European continent, and is considered their signature song. In the Netherlands, two more singles were pulled off the album, "J.O.S. Days" and "The Panorama Man".

Track listing
All tracks written by Hofstede, Stips, Kloet.

Vinyl release

Side A
In the Dutch Mountains – 3:26
J.O.S. Days – 3:13
Two Skaters – 6:51
Pelican and Penguin – 3:57
In a Play (Das Mädchen im Pelz) – 3:35
Oom-Pah-Pah – 1:21

Side B
The Panorama Man – 3:29
Mountain Jan – 4:41
One Eye Open – 3:16
An Eating House – 5:53
The Swimmer – 3:50
Good Night – 2:42

In 2010 a legal vinyl re-release came out on the Music On Vinyl label which added three extra bonus tracks, also available on the cd release, and an etching.

Side C
Strangers Of The Night - 4:27
The Magic Of Lassie – 1:37
Moon And Stars – 4:31

CD release
In the Dutch Mountains – 3:26
J.O.S. Days – 3:13
Two Skaters – 6:51
Pelican and Penguin – 3:57
In a Play (Das Mädchen im Pelz) – 3:35
Oom-Pah-Pah – 1:21
The Panorama Man – 3:29
Mountain Jan – 4:41
One Eye Open – 3:16
An Eating House – 5:53
The Swimmer – 3:50
Good Night – 2:42
Strangers of the Night – 4:27
The Magic of Lassie – 1:37
Moon and Stars – 4:31

Personnel

The band
 Henk Hofstede – vocals, guitar
 Robert Jan Stips – keyboards, backing vocals
 Joke Geraets – double bass
 Rob Kloet – drums

Additional musicians
 Jaap van Beusekom – steel guitar
 Jolanda de Wit – backing vocals
 Saskia van Essen – backing vocals
 Lieve Geuens – backing vocals

Technical staff
 The Nits – producers
 Paul Telman – engineer

Covers 
The title song was covered by Dutch garage rock band Claw Boys Claw, on their 1988 album ‘’Hitkillers’’, and Dutch folk metal band Heidevolk, on their album ‘’Velua’’.

References

1987 albums
Nits (band) albums
Columbia Records albums